Petr Svojtka (25 September 1946 – 9 May 1982) was a Czechoslovak actor.  In 1968 he graduated from the Faculty of Theatre in Prague. He died in a tram accident.

Work

Theater
 Romeo (W. Shakespeare, Romeo i Julia, 1971)
 Benjamin (V. Nezval, Milenci z kiosku, 1975)
 Edmund (W. Shakespeare, Král Lear, 1980)
 Lucius (J. Drda, Hrátky s čertem, 1982).

Television
 Youngest of the Hamr's Family (1975)
 Žena za pultem (1977)
 Inženýrská odysea (1979)
 Arabela (1980)
 Okres na severu (1981).

Film
 Nevěsta (1970)
 Lovers in the Year One (1973)
 The Little Mermaid (1976)
 Hodinářova svatební cesta korálovým mořem (1979)
 Ta chvíle, ten okamžik (1981).

References

External links
  Czechoslovak Film Database
  

1946 births
1982 deaths
Czech male stage actors
Czech male television actors
Czech male film actors
Male actors from Prague
20th-century Czech male actors